Frank Joseph Bell (June 4, 1880 – November 5, 1957) was an American aviator from Wisconsin. Bell also worked as a dentist. Bell was a member of the Early Birds of Aviation.

Biography
He was born in 1880 in Potosi, Wisconsin. In 1912, Bell flew the first recorded flight into Billings Logan International Airport in Billings, Montana. He utilized a homemade Curtiss 0-x-5 airplane. He married Alice A. McCormick in 1906.

He died on November 5, 1957 in Billings.

References

External links
 Frank J. Bell at Early Aviators

American aviators
1880 births
1957 deaths
Members of the Early Birds of Aviation
People from Potosi, Wisconsin
American dentists
20th-century dentists